Tazmalt is a town in northern Algeria. It's about 85 km south west of Bejaia, 50 km at east of Bouira, 55 km south east of Tizi Ouzou, and 165 km south east of the capital Algiers. Tazmalt is the biggest city of Sahel-Djurdjura region, and the fourth in Kabylia, with a population of 25,000. The Béni Mansour-Bejaïa line serves this community with SNTF train service.

Communes of Béjaïa Province
Cities in Algeria
Algeria